Christ College may refer to:

Christ College (Sydney), Australia
 Christ College, Tasmania, Australia
 Christ College, Hong Kong, Hong Kong
 Christ University, Bangalore, India
 Christ College, Cuttack, India
 Christ College, Pune, India
 Christ College, Rajkot, India
 Christ College, Thalassery, India
 Christ College, Irinjalakuda, India
 The original name of Concordia University Irvine, United States
 Christ College, Lynchburg, United States
 The Honors College of Valparaiso University, United States
 Christ College, Brecon, Wales

See also
 Christ Church College (disambiguation)
 Christ's College (disambiguation)